George Bradley (29 April 1850 – 24 April 1887) was an English cricketer who played for Derbyshire in 1875.

Bradley was born in Derby and became a house painter living in Derby. He played one match for Derbyshire in the 1875 season against Nottinghamshire. Bradley was a right-handed batsman and made one run in his two innings. He was a right-arm bowler and bowled economically during the game, though he failed to take any wickets for 17 runs.

Bradley died in Litchurch, Derby shortly before his 37th birthday.

References

1850 births
1887 deaths
Derbyshire cricketers
English cricketers
House painters
Cricketers from Derby